Chumpol Bua-ngam (born September 2, 1986), simply known as Wut, is a Thai professional footballer who plays as a centre back or a left back for Thai League 1 club Police Tero.

References

External links
 
 Profile at Goal
https://us.soccerway.com/players/chumpol-bua-ngam/287692/

1986 births
Living people
Chumpol Bua-ngam
Chumpol Bua-ngam
Association football central defenders
Chumpol Bua-ngam
Chumpol Bua-ngam
Chumpol Bua-ngam
Chumpol Bua-ngam
Chumpol Bua-ngam
Chumpol Bua-ngam